James W. Powers (February 29, 1928 – July 27, 2013) was an American football quarterback, defensive back and linebacker in the National Football League. He played for the San Francisco 49ers. He played college football for the USC Trojans.

References

1928 births
2013 deaths
American football quarterbacks
American football defensive backs
American football linebackers
San Francisco 49ers players
USC Trojans football players